John Deane may refer to:
John Deane (MP) (1583–1626), English Member of Parliament, 1621–1622
John Deane (of Oxenwood) (c. 1632–1694), English Member of Parliament elected in 1689
John Deane (sailor) (1679–1761), English sailor
John Deane (colonial administrator) (fl. 1723–1732), administrator of the East India Company
John Bathurst Deane (1797–1887), curate, antiquary and author
John Deane (inventor) (1800–1884), co-inventor of the diving helmet
John M. Deane (1840–1914), U.S. soldier
John Deane (Australian politician) (1842–1913), politician in Queensland, Australia
John R. Deane (1896–1982), U.S. Army officer and author
John R. Deane Jr. (1919–2013), U.S. soldier
John F. Deane (born 1943), Irish poet and novelist
John Deane, radio astronomer and CSIRO co-inventor of IEEE 802.11 Wi-Fi networking standard

See also
John Dean (disambiguation)